Neurocomputer may refer to:

 Wetware computer, a computer made of living neurons
 Artificial neural network, a mathematical model designed to imitate the function of living nerve cells